Home Reef is a volcanic island atop a submarine volcano in Tonga. It is located southwest of Vava'u, between the islands of Kao and Late along the Tofua volcanic arc. The island is ephemeral, and has been repeatedly built and eroded by successive eruptions in 1852, 1857, 1984, 2006, and 2022.

An eruption in 1984 built a small, temporary island , as well as pumice rafts which washed up as far away as Fiji and Australia. The island washed away within a few months.

The island was first seen by the crew of a yacht, who recorded its emergence in their blog. The eruptions produced extensive rafts of pumice, which drifted northeast from the new island. The pumice rafts and new island were imaged by the Aqua satellite in August 2006. Images also revealed several small hot crater lakes on the newly formed island.

The volcano erupted again in September 2022. The eruption ended on 17 October.

See also

List of volcanoes in Tonga
List of recently born islands

References

Active volcanoes
Submarine volcanoes
Volcanoes of Tonga
Ephemeral islands
Former islands from the last glacial maximum